The Syrian Revolutionaries Front (Jabhat Thowar Suriya, SRF, also translated Syrian Rebel Front) is an alliance of 14 relatively moderate religious and some secular armed groups fighting under the banner of the Free Syrian Army, formed in December 2013, thus according to Arutz Sheva further sidelining the FSA and its leadership Supreme Military Council. It was established as a response to the merger of Islamist Syrian rebels into the Islamic Front.

History

Northern branch
In December 2013, following initial clashes, the Islamic Front and the Syrian Revolutionaries Front agreed to reconcile. The coalition was spearheaded by Jamal Maarouf, head of the Syrian Martyrs' Brigades, largest member group of the SRF based in Jabal Zawiya, Idlib Governorate. The group has supported the Geneva II Middle East peace conference that is aimed at resolving the Syrian civil war. The group received financial support from Saudi Arabia, while the United States has reportedly given the group only non-lethal aid like food, medicine and blankets, in part due to concerns over its involvement in smuggling and extortion.

100 members of the SRF's Wolves of al-Ghab Brigade were killed in clashes with al-Qaeda's al-Nusra Front near Jisr al-Shughur on 16 July 2014.

In late October 2014 clashes erupted again between the SRF and al-Nusra in the Jabal al-Zawiya region of Idlib, over the following days, dozens of SRF fighters defected to Nusra and the group lost control of numerous villages as they withdrew their forces from the region. Maarouf and some of his followers relocated to Turkey, however around half of his men in the region remained behind and accepted the change of control rather than fight.

On 5 May 2015, some of the former members of the Hazzm Movement, the Syria Revolutionaries Front based in the north, Jabhat al-Akrad, the Dawn of Freedom Brigades and smaller FSA groups formed the Army of Revolutionaries. Many of their northern members also dissolved into the Levant Front.

During the Turkish military intervention in Syria which started in late August 2016, some members of the Syrian Revolutionaries Front and the Hazm Movement in exile from Turkey crossed into Syria through Jarabulus.

Northern groups (now defunct)
 Syrian Martyrs' Brigades
 Idlib Military Council (dissolved in June 2014)
 Idlib Martyrs' Brigade
 Ansar Brigades
 Wolves of al-Ghab Brigade
 Free North Brigade
 Northern Farouq Battalions
 Mountain Hawks Brigade (left to join the 5th Corps in September 2014)
 Hama Farouq Battalions
 Khalid ibn al-Walid Brigade (left in July 2014)
 Union of Free Zawiya Brigades (left in May 2014 to join the Syrian Salvation Front)
 Al-Qaqaa Brigade
 9th Special Forces Division of Aleppo (left in January 2014 to join the Hazzm Movement)
Syrian Kurdish Revolutionary Council (Komala) (joined in April 2014, left in October 2014)

Southern branch
The group is currently only active in southern Syria, as a member of a Southern Front group, and previously part of the First Army of the Southern Front. On 2 March 2016, a car bomb explosion targeted the SRF headquarters in Quneitra and killed its commander Captain Abu Hamza al-Naimi and 4 other field commanders. Some time in 2016, the SRF's branch in Jubata al-Khashab split into 3 factions. The local SRF commander in the area also defected to the Golan Regiment.

On 6 April 2017, clashes erupted between the SRF and Jabhat Ansar al-Islam in the northern Quneitra countryside, which resulted in 7 rebels being killed. Government forces shelled the area on the same day, which resulted in a ceasefire between the two rebel groups.

On 31 July 2017, 5 SRF groups in Daraa and Quneitra merged into the 1st Infantry Division and established a unified command structure for the SRF.

Southern groups

 1st Infantry Division
 1st Infantry Gathering
 Gathering of Righteousness
 Brigade of Two Holy Mosques
 Union of the Unity of the Nation
 Saladin Brigades
 Tank Brigade
63rd Southern Division
Dawn of the Levant Union
Abu Dujana Brigades
Jafar al-Tayyar Brigade
Lions of Mercy Brigade
Free Yarmouk Brigade
Hazm Brigade
Mercy Brigade
Southern Martyrs Brigade
Martyr Abdul Rahim Samour Brigade
Special Tasks Brigade
Coming Victory Brigade
7th Division
Riyad al-Salehin Battalions of Damascus
Special Assignments Regiment of Damascus
Armenian Battalion
Helpers Brigades
Southern Swords Division
Martyr Captain Abu Hamza al-Naimi Union

Former
 Omari Brigades

See also
 List of armed groups in the Syrian Civil War

References

Anti-government factions of the Syrian civil war
Organizations established in 2013
2013 establishments in Syria